Dmitri Nikolayevich Khomich (born 4 October 1984) is a Russian former football goalkeeper.

Career
He made his Russian Premier League debut for FC Alania Vladikavkaz on 16 August 2003 in a game against PFC Krylia Sovetov Samara, at the age of 18.

In February 2014, Khomich signed for a three-year contract with FC Kairat of the Kazakhstan Premier League. In October 2014, Khomich, along with Mikhail Bakayev, Zaurbek Pliyev, Aleksandr Kislitsyn and Samat Smakov, was banned from training with FC Kairat by the club. Khomich left FC Kairat in November 2014, following the conclusion of the 2014 season.

In February 2015, Khomich signed a contract with Amkar Perm till the end of the 2014–15 season.

Career statistics

Club

References

External links
 
 
 Profile at spartak.com
 Statistics at RFU site

1984 births
Sportspeople from Vladikavkaz
Living people
Russian footballers
Russia under-21 international footballers
Association football goalkeepers
FC Spartak Moscow players
FC Spartak Vladikavkaz players
FC Kairat players
PFC Spartak Nalchik players
FC Amkar Perm players
FC Khimki players
FC SKA-Khabarovsk players
Russian Premier League players
Russian First League players
Russian Second League players
Kazakhstan Premier League players
Russian expatriate footballers
Expatriate footballers in Kazakhstan